Montagna dei Fiori (Italian: "Mountain of the Flowers") is a mountain group in the Abruzzo, central Italy, forming the Monti Gemelli massif, together with the Montagna di Campli. It is located nearby the boundary between the province of Teramo and the Marche region; due to its proximity to Ascoli Piceno, it is also known as Montagna d'Ascoli.

The highest peak is the Monte Girella, at 1,814 m above the sea level.

The mountain, at an elevation of 1,110 m, is home to the hamlet of San Giacomo, a frazione of Valle Castellana and one of the main ski resorts in the area.

Fiori
Mountains of Marche
Fiori